Shelagh Hudson Ratcliffe (born 25 January 1952) is a retired British swimmer.

Swimming career
She won bronze medals in the 200 metres and 400 metres medley at the 1970 European Aquatics Championships. She competed in these events at the 1968 and 1972 Summer Olympics and finished fifth in the 400 m medley in 1968.

She also represented England and won a silver medal in the 200 metres medley and a bronze medal in the 400 metres medley, at the 1970 British Commonwealth Games in Edinburgh, Scotland. At the ASA National British Championships she won the 1969 220 yards freestyle title  and was eight times champion in the medley events winning both the 220 yards medley and 440 yards medley titles in 1967, 1968, 1969 and 1970.

She retired in 1973 to pursue a career in business.

References

See also
 List of Commonwealth Games medallists in swimming (women)

1952 births
Living people
Swimmers at the 1968 Summer Olympics
Swimmers at the 1972 Summer Olympics
Olympic swimmers of Great Britain
English female swimmers
Sportspeople from Liverpool
European Aquatics Championships medalists in swimming
Swimmers at the 1970 British Commonwealth Games
Commonwealth Games medallists in swimming
Commonwealth Games silver medallists for England
Commonwealth Games bronze medallists for England
20th-century English women
21st-century English women
Medallists at the 1970 British Commonwealth Games